Joe Newman Quintet at Count Basie's is a live album by trumpeter Joe Newman recorded in New York in 1961 for the Mercury label.

Reception

AllMusic reviewer Tim Sendra stated: "While this record may have seemed like the beginning of a great solo career for Joe Newman, in fact it was his final session for a major label as a leader... It isn't an essential purchase for the casual jazz fan but Newman fans (and fans of great trumpeters) will be thrilled by its appearance".

Track listing
All compositions by Joe Newman, except as indicated.
 "Caravan" (Juan Tizol, Duke Ellington, Irving Mills) - 9:46
 "Love Is Here to Stay" (George Gershwin, Ira Gershwin) - 4:33
 "Someone to Love" (Bob Warren) - 5:46
 "The Midgets" - 4:18
 "Cute" (Neal Hefti)  Bonus track on reissue
 "On Green Dolphin Street" (Bronisław Kaper, Ned Washington) - 5:52
 "Wednesday's Blues" - 8:10
 "Bird Song" (Thad Jones) - 6:19 Bonus track on reissue

Personnel 
Joe Newman - trumpet
Oliver Nelson - tenor saxophone
Lloyd Mayers - piano
Art Davis - bass
Ed Shaughnessy - drums

References 

1962 live albums
Mercury Records live albums
Joe Newman (trumpeter) live albums
Albums produced by Quincy Jones
Live instrumental albums